Abraxas gephyra is a species of moth belonging to the family Geometridae. It was described by West in 1929. It is known from Luzon in the Philippines.

References

Abraxini
Moths of Asia
Moths described in 1929